Padraig McGoldrick is a Gaelic footballer.

McGoldrick won an All-Ireland Junior Football Championship with the Sligo county team. More recently he has plied his trade with the London county team.

On 26 May 2013, McGoldrick - playing for London - missed a penalty and was sent off in London's 1-12 - 0–14 victory over Sligo - their first victory in the Connacht Senior Football Championship since 1977.

References

Year of birth missing (living people)
Living people
London inter-county Gaelic footballers
Sligo inter-county Gaelic footballers